Jaime Bladas (born 11 May 1936) is a Spanish former sports shooter. He competed at the 1964 Summer Olympics and the 1968 Summer Olympics. He finished ninth in the trap shooting and tenth in the skeet.

References

External links
 

1936 births
Living people
Spanish male sport shooters
Olympic shooters of Spain
Shooters at the 1964 Summer Olympics
Shooters at the 1968 Summer Olympics
Sportspeople from Barcelona
20th-century Spanish people